Mark Jamie Donovan (born 3 April 1999) is a British cyclist, who currently rides for UCI ProTeam . In October 2020, he was named in the startlist for the 2020 Vuelta a España.

Major results

Cyclo-cross

2015–2016
 1st  National Junior Championships
2016–2017
 Junior National Trophy Series
3rd Derby

Road

2017
 1st  Overall Giro di Basilicata
1st  Points classification
1st Stage 3
 1st  Overall Aubel–Thimister–La Gleize
1st Stage 2a (TTT)
 1st  Mountains classification, Driedaagse van Axel
 5th Overall Ronde des Vallées
2018
 1st Stage 2 Giro della Valle d'Aosta
 4th Overall Giro Ciclistico d'Italia
 6th Overall Volta ao Alentejo
 7th Overall Tour Alsace
2021
 9th Overall Tour of Britain

Grand Tour general classification results timeline

References

External links

1999 births
Living people
British male cyclists
English male cyclists
People from Penrith, Cumbria
Sportspeople from Cumbria
21st-century British people